Omer Fattah Hussain (Born: As-Sulaymaniyah) is the former deputy Prime Minister of the Kurdistan Regional Government (KRG) in Iraq. Due to political problems in the PUK, he handed his resignation in on 24 February 2009. He also served as acting Prime Minister of Jalal Talebani's Suleimaniyeh based Kurdish administration from July 2004 (when Barham Salih resigned to become Deputy Prime Minister for the Iraqi Interim Government until June 2005 with the re-unification of Iraq's Kurdish autonomous Republic.

See also
 List of Kurdish people
 Patriotic Union of Kurdistan

References

Living people
Prime Ministers of Kurdistan Region
Kurdistan Democratic Party politicians
Patriotic Union of Kurdistan politicians
1948 births